Galenara is a genus of moths in the family Geometridae described by James Halliday McDunnough in 1920.

Species
Galenara consimilis Heinrich, 1931
Galenara lallata (Hulst, 1898)
Galenara glaucaria (Grossbeck, 1912)
Galenara lixaria (Grote, 1883)
Galenara lixarioides McDunnough, 1945
Galenara stenomacra Rindge, 1958
Galenara olivacea Rindge, 1958

Distribution
China.

References

Melanolophiini